Mazari also spelled as Majari is a village in Shaheed Bhagat Singh Nagar district of Punjab State, India. The village is administrated by Sarpanch an elected representative of the village.

Demography 
As of 2011, Mazari has a total number of 335 houses and population of 1508 of which 783 include are males while 725 are females according to the report published by Census India in 2011. The literacy rate of Mazari is 85.71% lower than the state average of 75.84%. The population of children under the age of 6 years is 136 which is 9.02% of total population of Mazari, and child sex ratio is approximately 679 as compared to Punjab state average of 846.

Most of the people are from Schedule Caste which constitutes 59.68% of total population in Mazari. The town does not have any Schedule Tribe population so far.

As per the report published by Census India in 2011, 473 people were engaged in work activities out of the total population of Mazari which includes 425 males and 48 females. According to census survey report 2011, 99.37% workers describe their work as main work and 0.63% workers are involved in Marginal activity providing livelihood for less than 6 months.

Education 
The village has a privet un-aided Punjabi medium, co-ed upper primary with secondary school established in 1954  and also has an privet un-aided Punjabi medium, co-ed primary with upper primary school which was established in 1989. The schools does not provide mid-day meal.

KC Engineering College and Doaba Khalsa Trust Group Of Institutions are the nearest colleges.

List of schools nearby:
Dashmesh Model School, Kahma
Govt Primary School, Kahlon
Govt High School, Garcha

Transport 

See also 
List of villages in India

References

External links 
 Tourism of Punjab
 Census of Punjab
 Locality Based PINCode

Villages in Shaheed Bhagat Singh Nagar district